East Finchley is a London Underground station in East Finchley in the London Borough of Barnet, north London. The station is on the High Barnet branch of the Northern line, between Finchley Central and Highgate stations, and is in Travelcard Zone 3.

The station was opened on 22 August 1867, on the Great Northern Railway's line between Finsbury Park and Edgware stations. As part of London Underground's only partially completed Northern Heights plan, the station was completely rebuilt with additional tracks in the late 1930s. Northern line trains started serving the station on 3 July 1939 and main line passenger services ended on 2 March 1941.

History

Original station

East Finchley station was built by the Edgware, Highgate and London Railway (EH&LR) on its line from Finsbury Park station to Edgware station. Before the line was opened, it was purchased in July 1867 by the larger Great Northern Railway (GNR), whose main line from King's Cross ran through Finsbury Park on its way to Potters Bar and the north. The station, originally named East End, Finchley, opened along with the railway to Edgware on 22 August that year. The station was given its current name either on 1 February 1887 or, alternatively, in 1886. As a result of the 1921 Railways Act, which created the "Big Four" railway companies, the GNR amalgamated with several other railways to create the London & North Eastern Railway (LNER) in 1923.

At the start of the 1930s, the station had around 54 trains daily from High Barnet and a few through trains from Edgware. Services ran to Finsbury Park and then either King's Cross, Moorgate or Broad Street.

Northern Heights project
In 1935, the London Passenger Transport Board (LPTB) announced a proposal, which became known as the Northern Heights project. This was to take over the LNER lines from Finsbury Park to Edgware, High Barnet and Alexandra Palace, and link them to both the Northern line at East Finchley and to the Northern City line at Finsbury Park. The construction of the first phase of this project involved extending tube train services from the Northern line's existing terminus at Archway station, through a new section of paired tunnels under the LNER's Highgate station to emerge south-east of East Finchley station, where track connections to the LNER line were made.

For the introduction of London Underground services, the original station was completely demolished and rebuilt. The station was provided with two additional platforms, giving four in total. The platforms comprise two parallel islands with tracks on both sides. This was necessary as the intention of the Northern Heights project was that trains would be able to run south from East Finchley to Highgate via both the surface and the underground routes. The inner pair of tracks served the surface route, whilst the outer pair serve the tunnel route.

Northern line trains first served the station on 3 July 1939. After completion of the electrification of the line to High Barnet, Underground services were extended northwards on 14 April 1940. The station continued to be served by LNER steam trains from Highgate until 2 March 1941 when that service was discontinued. The inner platforms are now used only by northbound trains entering service or southbound trains terminating at East Finchley on their way to or from Highgate Wood depot south of the station.

Post-war
After the war, plans to complete the Northern Heights project were reviewed but no work was carried out. Maintenance works and reconstruction of war damage on the existing network had the greatest call on London Underground funds. Funds for new works were severely limited and priority was given to the completion of the western and eastern extensions of the Central line to West Ruislip, Epping and Hainault. Despite being shown as under construction on underground maps as late as 1950, work never restarted on the unimplemented parts of the Northern Heights project.

British Rail (the successor to the LNER) freight trains continued to serve the station's goods yard until 1 October 1962, when it was closed.

Description of the building

The new station was constructed in an Art Deco/Streamline Moderne design by Charles Holden with L H Bucknell. Like Holden's other designs for London Underground in the 1930s, East Finchley station was inspired by European architecture (particularly Dutch) that Holden had seen on trips to the continent during that decade. The track here runs roughly north-west to south-east. The imposing station building, built on rising ground adjacent to the railway bridge over High Road (A1000), has three entrances. The two main entrances to the ticket hall are on the north side of the tracks facing High Road and the third, minor entrance, is on the south side. The entrances are linked by a passage under the tracks which provides access up to the platforms.

A strong feature of the station is the semi-circular glazed stairways leading to the enclosed bridge over the tracks occupied by staff offices. Prominent from the platforms and dominating the main entrance façade is The Archer, a  statue by Eric Aumonier of a kneeling archer captured as if having just released an arrow. The archer is intended to commemorate Finchley's ancient association with hunting in the nearby Royal Forest of Enfield. The station is a Grade II listed building.

Services and connections

Services
The station is in Travelcard Zone 3, between Finchley Central and Highgate stations. Train frequencies vary throughout the day, but generally operate every 3–7 minutes between 05:40 and 01:01 northbound and 05:34 and 00:12 southbound (as of 2015).

Connections
London Buses routes 102, 143, 234, 263, 603 and H3 and night route N20 serve the station.

Notes and references

Notes

References

Bibliography

External links

London Transport Museum Photographic Archive

Northern line stations
Tube stations in the London Borough of Barnet
Art Deco architecture in London
Art Deco railway stations
Railway stations in Great Britain opened in 1867
Former Great Northern Railway stations
Grade II listed railway stations
Grade II listed buildings in the London Borough of Barnet
Charles Holden railway stations
London Underground Night Tube stations